Baltazar Miaskowski (1570–1632) was a Catholic prelate who served as Auxiliary Bishop of Włocławek (1617–1632) and Titular Bishop of Margarita (1617–1632).

Biography
Baltazar Miaskowski was born in 1570 in Smogoseno, Poland.
On 22 May 1617, he was appointed during the papacy of Pope Paul V as Auxiliary Bishop of Włocławek and Titular Bishop of Margarita.
On 18 Mar 1618, he was consecrated bishop by Paweł Wołucki, Bishop of Włocławek, with Stanisław Sieciński, Bishop of Przemyśl, and Adam Nowodworski, Bishop of Kamyanets-Podilskyi, serving as co-consecrators. 
He served as Auxiliary Bishop of Włocławek until his death in 1632.

While bishop, he was the principal co-consecrator of Franciszek Zajerski, Auxiliary Bishop of Lutsk and Titular Bishop of Argos (1622).

References

External links and additional sources
 (for Chronology of Bishops) 
 (for Chronology of Bishops)  
 (for Chronology of Bishops) 
 (for Chronology of Bishops)  

17th-century Roman Catholic bishops in the Polish–Lithuanian Commonwealth
Bishops appointed by Pope Paul V
1570 births
1632 deaths